Dr. Yizhar Hess (born July 5, 1967) is the executive director and chief executive officer of the Conservative Judaism movement in Israel, also known as Masorti.

Early life 
Yizhar Hess was born and educated in Jerusalem, and he studied in the Gymnasia Rehavia, where he was active in the Tzofim (scouts). He has a BA in Hebrew Literature and Political Science from the Hebrew University in Jerusalem, a degree in law from The Interdisciplinary Center Herzliya and an MA degree in Jewish Studies from the Schechter Institute of Jewish Studies, and a Ph.D. from the Department of Philosophy of Education at Sussex University in Brighton, England.

Hess started his service the Israel Defense Forces in 1985 as a combatant soldier in the Armored Corps and later as an information officer in the Education and Youth Corps.

Career
After his release from the Israel Defense Forces in 1990, Hess worked as a copywriter in an advertising agency and later as a journalist in the Shishi (Friday) newspaper.

During his studies in the Hebrew University, he joined the Shorashim Institute for Jewish Studies. Hess conducted and directed seminars at the Institute until he was appointed vice CEO of the Institute in 1996, a position he held until 1999.

In 2000 Hess started serving as the Jewish Agency's shaliach to Tucson, Arizona. He wrote a weekly column in the Arizona Jewish Post and won an excellence Award (2002) from the Association of Jewish Centers in North America (now known as the JCCA, the JCC Association) for the many cultural programs he initiated in Arizona and an Excellence Award on behalf of the Jewish Federation (2003).  He was also a regular commentator about Israel on the weekly program The Too Jewish Radio Show with Rabbi Sam Cohon and Friends during his tenure in Tucson.

He returned to Israel in 2003 and continued working in the Jewish Agency as the director of partnerships between Jewish communities abroad and in Israel.

Yizhar became the CEO of the Conservative or Masorti movement in Israel in 2007. He has served as one of the negotiators attempting to work out an agreement to handle pluralist worship at the Western Wall that would meet the requirements of the Women of the Wall and the requirements of Rabbi Shmuel Rabinowitz, the Administrator of the Western Wall and the Holy Sites. An agreement was announced among the various factions in early 2016, but when ultra-orthodox members of the current government coalition threatened to abandon the coalition, Prime Minister Benjamin Netanyahu announced difficulties and said the arrangement would take longer.  Hess criticized Netanyahu's backtracking on the agreement.

Hess has been an outspoken critic of fundamentalist streams of all religions that seek to limit religious freedom, stating:"We must say it loud and clear: Jewish fundamentalism is no better and no worse than any other kind of religious fundamentalism. The only difference is that it is clear to all of us that we must fight Islamic fundamentalism. But when it comes to the fundamentalism in our own home, the fundamentalism which is active within us, which is threatening our life as a Jewish-democratic state and endangering Zionism as a historic enterprise, we hesitate even after 20 years."Hess also defended Conservative Judaism against criticism from David Lau, Ashkenazi Chief Rabbi of Israel, who made disparaging remarks about Bayit Yehudi chairman and Education Minister Naftali Bennett visiting a Conservative Jewish school in the U.S.

Hess has expressed concern that if politicians and Orthodox rabbis continue to disparage non-Orthodox streams of Judaism, if the Knesset delays pluralist worship solutions for the Western Wall and passes legislation limiting non-Orthodox access to state-funded mikvehs, then the relationship between Israel and diaspora Jews could be severely damaged.

References

External links
 Publications and articles by Hess

1967 births
People from Jerusalem
Living people
Hebrew University of Jerusalem alumni
Israeli chief executives
Israeli journalists
American columnists
Reichman University alumni
Israeli Conservative Jews
Alumni of the University of Sussex
Israeli religious leaders
Israeli soldiers